Samuel Pérez Quiñones C. A., November 29, 1952 in San Juan, Puerto Rico, DMA is a Puerto Rican pianist with a doctorate in music arts in applied music (piano) from the University of Michigan.  He is a faculty member of the Music Department of the University of Puerto Rico, Rio Piedras Campus. Perez has given performances throughout Europe and the United States.

In 2003 he conducted a series of six concerts in Germany and Austria, including a piano concerto in Himmelkron Castle in Bayreuth.  In Austria he was soloist for the St. Oswald-Moderbrugg band and also interpreted pieces by Mozart, Albéniz, Liszt and Rachmaninoff.

External links
 Official Website
 University of Puerto Rico

Puerto Rican pianists
Living people
University of Michigan School of Music, Theatre & Dance alumni
American male pianists
21st-century American pianists
21st-century American male musicians
musicians from San Juan, Puerto Rico
Year of birth missing (living people)
University of Puerto Rico faculty